Cruciata is a genus of flowering plants in the family Rubiaceae. It is found in Europe, northern Africa, and across southern and central Asia from Turkey to the western Himalaya and north to the Altay region of Siberia.

Species
 Cruciata articulata (L.) Ehrend - Middle-East from Egypt and Turkey to Caucasus and Iran; also Crimea
 Cruciata elbrussica (Pobed.) Pobed. - Caucasus
 Cruciata glabra (L.) Opiz - Southern Europe from Portugal to Russia; also Algeria, Morocco, the Caucasus and the Altay region of Siberia
 Cruciata x grecescui (Prodan) Soo -  C. glabra × C. laevipes-  Romania
 Cruciata laevipes Opiz - Europe from Britain and Portugal to Russia; also Iran, Turkey, Caucasus and the Western Himalayas
 Cruciata mixta Ehrend. & Schönb.-Tem. - Turkey
 Cruciata pedemontana (Bellardi) Ehrend. - Central and southern Europe, Morocco; also Middle East from Palestine and Turkey to Afghanistan
 Cruciata taurica (Pall. ex Willd.) Ehrend. - from Greece and Palestine east to Turkmenistan
 Cruciata valentinae (Galushko) Galushko - Transcaucasus

References

External links
Cruciata in the World Checklist of Rubiaceae

Rubiaceae genera
Rubieae
Taxa named by Philip Miller